The following is a list of West Virginia-based breweries

The website BrilliantStream.com  maintains a current listing of all licensed, active West Virginia breweries, their addresses and contact info, as well as, keeps a listing of WV brewery projects in development.

See also
 List of microbreweries

References

West Virginia
Breweries